Americathon (also known as Americathon 1998) is a 1979 American comedy film directed by Neal Israel and starring John Ritter, Fred Willard, Peter Riegert, Harvey Korman, and Nancy Morgan, with narration by George Carlin. It is based on a play by Firesign Theatre members Phil Proctor and Peter Bergman. The movie includes appearances by Jay Leno, Meat Loaf, Tommy Lasorda, and Chief Dan George, with a musical performance by Elvis Costello.

Plot
In the (then-near future) year 1998, the United States has run out of oil, and many Americans are living in their now-stationary cars and using nonpowered means of transportation such as jogging, riding bicycles and rollerskating. Many Americans wear tracksuits. Paper money has become completely worthless, with all business transactions being conducted in gold; even a coin-operated elevator warns "Gold Coins Only". In search of leadership, Americans elect Chet Roosevelt as president of the United States. Roosevelt, a "cosmically inspired" former governor of California modeled on California governor Jerry Brown and wearing a three-piece tracksuit with vest, proves to have little in common with Theodore Roosevelt or Franklin D. Roosevelt other than his name. Roosevelt, an overly-optimistic man who quotes positive affirmation slogans, stages a number of highly publicized fund raising events, all of which fail. He becomes interested in having a relationship with Vietnamese American pop superstar Mouling Jackson. Real money comes in the form of loans from a cartel of Native Americans, led by billionaire Sam Birdwater, in control of Nike (styled as National Indian Knitting Enterprises; at the time of the film's release, they were still emerging as a company).

The federal government, now housed in "The Western White House" (a sub-leased condominium in Marina del Rey, California), finds itself facing national bankruptcy and in danger of being foreclosed and repossessed when Birdwater goes public on national television with the fact that he lent America billions of dollars and now wants his money back, the alternative being foreclosure and the country reverting to its original owners, stating "Hey, I have to eat, too. Does that make me a bad guy?"

In desperation, Roosevelt hires young television consultant Eric McMerkin to help produce a national raffle. Instead, they decide that the only way enough money can be raised to save America is instead to run a national telethon, and hire vapid TV celebrity Monty Rushmore to host it. However, Presidential adviser Vincent Vanderhoff is secretly plotting to have the telethon fail so that representatives of the United Hebrab Republic (formed by the merger of Israel and the Arab states) can purchase what is left of the country when Birdwater forecloses.

Cast
 John Ritter as President Chet Roosevelt
 Harvey Korman as Monty Rushmore
 Peter Riegert as Eric McMerkin
 Fred Willard as Vincent Vanderhoff
 Chief Dan George as Sam Birdwater
 Zane Buzby as Mouling Jackson
 Nancy Morgan as Lucy Beth
 Meat Loaf as Roy Budnitz
 Elvis Costello as the Earl of Manchester
 Tommy Lasorda as Jimmy Dunphy
 Jay Leno as Larry Miller
 Howard Hesseman as Kip Margolis
 Cybill Shepherd as Gold Girl
 Allan Arbus as Moishe Weitzman
 David Opatoshu as	Abdul Muhammad
 George Carlin as the Narrator

Production notes

Music
The soundtrack album, released August 18, 1979, features "It's a Beautiful Day" by The Beach Boys, "Crawling to the USA" by Elvis Costello and "Get a Move On" by Eddie Money.

In a scene that features a song by Vietnamese singer Mouling Jackson (Zane Buzby, better known as a TV director and philanthropist), a large poster of actor Burt Kwouk can be seen. The photo is actually taken from the 1968 film The Shoes of the Fisherman, in which Kwouk played Chinese leader Chairman Peng.

Cast
Dorothy Stratten appears, uncredited and in a brief non-speaking role, in a Playboy bunny style outfit during a scene where Meat Loaf's character donates blood. The Del Rubio triplets can be seen performing "America the Beautiful" behind several posing bodybuilders. John Carradine was to have played "Uncle Sam" in this movie, but his scenes did not make the final cut. Director Neal Israel has a cameo as a protesting rabbi holding a picket sign reading "The President Is a Yutz" (Yiddish for "a stupid, clueless person").

Playwrights
In a scene where Eric McMerkin is reading a list of "Government Approved" performers, the names of "Proctor & Bergman" (the co-authors of the original play) can be seen fifth on the list, credited as "Comics." Peter Bergman and Phil Proctor were members of the satirical comedy performance group Firesign Theatre.

Promotion
To promote the movie, Ted Coombs roller-skated across the United States and back and gained a place in the Guinness Book of World Records. A photo novel of the movie was released in 1979, and the musical soundtrack was released on both vinyl and audiocassette by Lorimar Records.

Reception
Roger Ebert gave the movie half of one star out of four and called it "a puerile exploitation of one very thin joke during 98 very long minutes." On his Sneak Previews program with Gene Siskel, Ebert said, "At times, it is a savage affront to the intelligence," and "It's not funny. It's one of the low points of my entire movie-going career." Janet Maslin of The New York Times wrote "The premise of Americathon is strong enough to sustain a 15-minute skit, but the movie has the ill fortune to drag on for an hour and a half." Dale Pollock of Variety stated "With a slow 85 minutes of Americathon to endure, film audience may go out and contribute to a fund to stop more pix like this from being made." Gene Siskel of the Chicago Tribune gave the movie one-and-a-half stars out of four and wrote, "'Americathon' is amusing in its first 20 minutes or so as it sets the stage for what's going on in 1998...But then it's 60 minutes of telethon, and frankly, even if you don't like Jerry Lewis, Korman's sendup wears awfully thin." Linda Gross of the Los Angeles Times wrote "The film has a clever premise, some funny sight gags and a few good one-liners, but the gag is too drawn out and watching the movie becomes like watching a TV variety show that goes on and on." Judith Martin of The Washington Post called the movie "a gross comedy that depends for jokes on President Carter's teeth, Governor Brown's psychoculture and other nationally recognized targets that anyone can hit blindfolded. Mostly, that film just whacks crudely away, although now and then it hits its mark with an impressive smack."

Home media
The movie was made available on VHS and laserdisc in the 1980s by Lorimar Home Video, both of which are now out of print. The home video rights passed to Warner Bros. in the late 1980s as part of their purchase of Lorimar. Warner Home Video made the movie available in January 2011 on DVD in widescreen (1.85:1) format as part of its Warner Archive Manufacture-on-demand collection.

Legacy
In 1984, New York City public radio station WNYC sponsored a marathon of American music dubbed "Americathon '84."

Predictions
Referencing the movie's futuristic premise itself, there were many societal or political forecasts woven into the storyline, and a number of these have become reality since the film's release, including:
 The People's Republic of China embraces capitalism and becomes a global economic superpower.
 Nike becomes a huge multinational conglomerate.
 The collapse of the USSR occurs.
 The prevalence of reality shows on television.
 Network television deals with previously taboo subjects accepted as normal (Monty Rushmore stars in the sitcom Both Father and Mother and plays a cross-dressing single father in the title role. The film's narrative also mentions The Schlong Show, a game show where contestants are judged by their reproductive organs).
 A governor of California is elected president.

References

Further reading

External links

Americathon on AFI
Americathon - Original Theatrical Trailer on YouTube
Where Are All the Films About Economic Apocalypse? Article about the film on Vice.com

1979 films
American satirical films
American science fiction comedy films
1970s science fiction comedy films
1970s English-language films
Films about fictional presidents of the United States
American films based on plays
Films directed by Neal Israel
Films produced by Joe Roth
Films scored by Tom Scott
Films about television
Films set in 1998
Films set in the future
Peak oil films
Retrofuturism
Films with screenplays by Monica Johnson
United Artists films
Films with screenplays by Neal Israel
1979 comedy films
1970s political comedy films
1970s American films